Bálsamo (Portuguese for "balsam") is a municipality in the state of São Paulo, Brazil. The population is 9,139 (2020 est.) in an area of 149.9 km². The municipality belongs to the Mesoregion and Microregion of São José do Rio Preto.

Neighbouring municipalities
Mirassolândia, Mirassol, Neves Paulista, Monte Aprazível and Tanabi

Population history

Demographics

According to the 2000 IBGE Census, the population was 7,632, of which 6,338 are urban and 1,002 are rural. The average life expectancy was 73.28 years. The literacy rate was at 89.12%.

References

External links
  http://www.balsamo.sp.gov.br
  on citybrazil.com.br

Municipalities in São Paulo (state)